Fraser's danio or Fraser danio (Devario fraseri) is a freshwater fish endemic to waters in the northern Western Ghats in the state of Maharashtra in India.

References

Freshwater fish of India
Fish described in 1935
Taxa named by Sunder Lal Hora
Devario